The Eaton Electric Generating Plant was a three-unit Natural gas-fired power plant located in Petal, Mississippi. Each of the three units generated 22.5 Megawatts (MW) of electricity, with a total plant capacity of 67.5 MW. The plant drew cooling water from the Leaf River.

Named for Barney Eaton, Mississippi Power's first president, the plant was the first high-pressure steam plant in the state of Mississippi and the first plant built by Mississippi Power Company, a wholly owned subsidiary of Southern Company.  Plant Eaton made headlines when it was built in 1945 as it was the largest and most modern plant of its day. The first unit came on line March 22, 1945.

Originally, Plant Eaton was intended to generate electricity to aid the United States in production of materials for World War II; however, the plant's largest contribution turned out to be producing power for the boom in electricity demanded following the war. As of the late 1990s, its use was limited to meeting peak demands during the summer.

Plant Eaton was closed down in 2012 due to declining efficiency. The plant was demolished in 2014.

References

External links
Mississippi Power Homepage

Energy infrastructure completed in 1945
Buildings and structures in Forrest County, Mississippi
Coal-fired power stations in Mississippi
Southern Company
Buildings and structures demolished in 2014
Demolished buildings and structures in Mississippi
Former power stations in Mississippi